The Dr Lagan Cup was an inter-county Gaelic football competition in the province of Ulster. The competition was discontinued in 1967 when Donegal won the competition. The Lagan Cup was the trophy for a Senior Football League, which at the time was limited to seven Ulster counties, unlike the Dr McKenna Cup, which is a knockout competition that includes all nine of Ulster's counties.

Frankie Donnelly holds the record for the highest individual scoring tally in an inter-county match, with 4–11 for Tyrone against Fermanagh in the 1957 Dr Lagan Cup.

Top winners

See also
 Dr McKenna Cup

References

Defunct Gaelic football competitions
Gaelic football competitions in Ulster
Gaelic football cup competitions
L
1943 establishments in Ireland